Paralophonotus auroguttata is a moth in the family Cossidae, and the only species in the genus Paralophonotus. It is found in Angola, Cameroon, the Democratic Republic of Congo, Ghana, Guinea-Bissau and Sierra Leone.

Etymology
The genus name is derived from Greek para (meaning near) plus the genus-name Eulophonotus minus eu.

References

Natural History Museum Lepidoptera generic names catalog

Zeuzerinae